Jonathan Axelrod (born 1949) is an American producer and screenwriter. Axelford wrote for film Every Little Crook and Nanny (1972). He was executive producer on the television series Dave's World.

References

External links

1949 births
Living people
Television producers from New York (state)
Screenwriters from New York (state)
American television writers
American male television writers
American male screenwriters
American television producers